Estudillo House may refer to;

 Estudillo House, a city landmark in Riverside, California; see List of landmarks in Riverside, California#Estudillo House
 Casa de Estudillo, in San Diego, California
 Casa de Estudillo (San Leandro, California)
 Estudillo Mansion, in San Jacinto, California

See also
Estudillo family of California